SS Walter M. Christiansen was a Liberty ship built in the United States during World War II.

Construction
Walter M. Christiansen was laid down on 15 November 1944, under a Maritime Commission (MARCOM) contract, MC hull 2511, by the St. Johns River Shipbuilding Company, Jacksonville, Florida; she was sponsored by Mrs. Russell Knapp, the widow of the namesake, and launched on 16 December 1944.

History
She was allocated to American Range Liberty Line, on 27 December 1944. On 25 March 1948, she was placed in the Hudson River Reserve Fleet, Jones Point, New York. She was sold for commercial use, 17 January 1951, to Zenith Steamship Co. She was withdrawn from the fleet, 21 February 1951.

References

Bibliography

 
 
 
 

 

Liberty ships
Ships built in Jacksonville, Florida
1944 ships
Hudson River Reserve Fleet